Olivia Hime (born June 25, 1943) is a Brazilian singer and lyricist. She is also the co-owner and musical manager of the record label Biscoito Fino. In 2005, the song Cancao Transparente, composed by Hime and her husband, pianist and composer Francis Hime, was nominated for a Latin Grammy for Best Brazilian Song.

Early life and education
Hime was a student of the Santa Úrsula.

Career
Home composed give songs on her husband's first LP, produced by Dori Caymmi. The compositions were created in partnership with her husband. Together, they run their own compositions A Tarde and Almamúsica.

Personal life
Hime is married to composer Francis Hime. He left his engineering career to become a musician and was inspired by Vinícius de Moraes. The couple has three daughters: Luiza, Joana and Maria.

Discography
 Palavra de Guerra Ao Vivo — CD & DVD (2008)
 Palavras de Guerra (2007)
 Canção Transparente (2004)
 Mar de Algodão (2002)
 Olivia Hime canta Chiquinha Gonzaga — Serenata de Uma Mulher (2002)
 Alta Madrugada (1997)
 Estrela da Vida Inteira (1987)
 O Fio da Meada (1985)
 Máscara (1983)
 Segredo do meu coração (1982)
 Olivia Hime (1981)

References

External links
Biography of Olívia Hime
Discography and life

1943 births
Living people
20th-century Brazilian women singers
20th-century Brazilian singers
Lyricists
Musicians from Rio de Janeiro (city)
21st-century Brazilian women singers
21st-century Brazilian singers